Guŏshùshìfànchăng is a Township-like area in Jixian County which is under the jurisdiction of the prefecture-level city of  Shuangyashan in Heilongjiang province of China. The population as of the 2010 census is 303.

References

Township-level divisions of Heilongjiang
Shuangyashan